Arts Center Station may refer to:

Arts Center Station (Incheon), a subway station in Incheon, South Korea
Arts Center station (MARTA), a MARTA train station in Atlanta, Georgia